A total solar eclipse will occur on September 26, 2117. A solar eclipse occurs when the Moon passes between Earth and the Sun, thereby totally or partly obscuring the image of the Sun for a viewer on Earth. A total solar eclipse occurs when the Moon's apparent diameter is larger than the Sun's, blocking all direct sunlight, turning day into darkness. Totality occurs in a narrow path across Earth's surface, with the partial solar eclipse visible over a surrounding region thousands of kilometres wide.

Visibility 
It will be visible at sunrise across eastern Asia, Sakhalin and Kuril Islands, and then crossing the Pacific Ocean, including Kiribati. It will be visible as a partial eclipse over Hawaii, and at sunset partial eclipse over parts of Alaska.

Saros 136

Notes

References 
 Besselian Elements - Total Solar Eclipse of 2117 September 26
 

2117 09 26
2117 09 26
2117 09 26
2110s